The Indiana and Ohio Railway  is an American railroad that operates  of track in Ohio, southern Michigan, and parts of southeastern Indiana.  It is owned and operated by Genesee & Wyoming, who acquired the railroad in the 2012 purchase of RailAmerica.  The railroad's traffic comes mainly from grain, lumber products, metals, and chemical products.  The IORY hauled around 62,000 carloads in 2008.

History 
The IORY's original line, acquired in 1985, connected Mason and Monroe, Ohio. The IORY set up a tourist operation known as the Indiana and Ohio Scenic Railway which operated over this line. The tourist train still operates out of Lebanon, Ohio under the ownership of the Cincinnati Railway Company (CRC) under the name Lebanon Mason Monroe Railroad.

Another line, acquired in 1986, runs from Norwood to Brecon, Ohio.

In 1991, the former DT&I between Washington Court House, Ohio and Springfield, Ohio came into the system via a designated operator agreement with the West Central Ohio Port Authority. The system expanded north into Michigan in 1997 when it acquired the remainder of the former DT&I mainline between Diann, Michigan and Springfield.

The Indiana and Ohio Railroad  merged into the IORY in 1997.  It had been formed in 1978 to operate a branch between Valley Junction, Ohio and Brookville, Indiana. 

In 1994, IORY acquired two lines from Conrail in Springfield: one between Springfield and Bellefontaine; and one between Springfield and Mechanicsburg. The Indiana and Ohio Central Railroad  was the designated owner of these two lines until 2004.

In 1996, it was acquired by RailTex. RailTex was absorbed by RailAmerica in 2000, and RailAmerica was acquired by Genesee & Wyoming in December 2012.

Fleet
As of July 2022, the I&O's roster consisted of the following, all built by EMD:

References

External links
Indiana and Ohio Railway official webpage - Genesee and Wyoming website

Indiana railroads
Ohio railroads
Michigan railroads
Regional railroads in the United States
RailAmerica
Spin-offs of Conrail